Valentina Zago (born 21 February 1990, Padua) is an Italian volleyball player. She plays as an opposite for Pinerolo .

She competed at the 2012 FIVB World Grand Prix, 2013 FIVB World Grand Prix, and 2018 FIVB Volleyball World Championship 

She played for Volleyball Casalmaggiore, Le Cannet Volley Ball,  and Pinerolo. In  2018 / 2019 she played for Salvino del Bene Scandicci, winning an Italian championship.

References 

1990 births
Italian women's volleyball players
Living people